John Whenham is an English musicologist and academic who specializes in early Italian baroque music. He earned both a Bachelor of Music and a Master of Music from the University of Nottingham, and a Doctor of Philosophy from the University of Oxford. He is a leading expert on the life and works of Claudio Monteverdi, and is the author of the books Duet and Dialogue in the Age of Monteverdi (Ann Arbor, Michigan: University Microfilms International, 1982) Monteverdi, 'Orfeo'  (London: Cambridge University Press, 1986), Monteverdi, Vespers (1610) (Cambridge University Press, 1997), and The Cambridge Companion to Monteverdi (with Richard Wistreich, Cambridge University Press, 2007). For five years he was co-editor of the journal Music & Letters. He currently serves on the board of the Birmingham Early Music Festival and was head of the music history department at the University of Birmingham.

References

Living people
Academics of the University of Birmingham
Alumni of the University of Nottingham
Alumni of the University of Oxford
English musicologists
Year of birth missing (living people)
Monteverdi scholars